All the Years Combine: The DVD Collection is a box set of videos by the rock band the Grateful Dead.  It contains 14 DVDs, comprising 12 previously released titles plus bonus material.  It also includes a 40-page booklet of liner notes, essays, and photos.  It was released by Shout! Factory on April 17, 2012.

Disc listing
All the Years Combine: The DVD Collection contains the following DVDs:

The Grateful Dead Movie, disc 1 – A theatrically released film, with principal photography from October 16 – 20, 1974 at the Winterland Ballroom in San Francisco.
The Grateful Dead Movie, disc 2 – Bonus material from the DVD release of the film.
The Closing of Winterland, disc 1 – The first and second sets of the December 31, 1978, concert at Winterland.
The Closing of Winterland, disc 2 – The third set of the December 31, 1978, concert, plus bonus material.
Dead Ahead – Electric and acoustic music performed live at Radio City Music Hall in New York City on October 30 and 31, 1980.
So Far – A music documentary co-directed by Jerry Garcia, with principal photography from 1985.
Ticket to New Year's – Most of the December 31, 1987, concert at the Oakland Coliseum Arena in Oakland.
Truckin' Up to Buffalo – The July 4, 1989, concert at Rich Stadium in Orchard Park, New York.
Downhill from Here – The July 17, 1989, concert at Alpine Valley Music Theatre near East Troy, Wisconsin.
View from the Vault – The July 8, 1990, concert at Three Rivers Stadium in Pittsburgh.
View from the Vault II – The June 14, 1991, concert at Robert F. Kennedy Stadium in Washington, D.C.
View from the Vault III – The June 16, 1990, concert at Shoreline Amphitheatre in Mountain View, California.
View from the Vault IV – The concerts performed on July 24, 1987, at Oakland Coliseum Stadium in Oakland, California, and on July 26, 1987, at Anaheim Stadium in Anaheim, California.
Bonus disc:
Songs from five live performances, previously unreleased.
Backstage Pass, a 35-minute music documentary directed by Justin Kreutzmann, the son of Bill Kreutzmann, with principal photography from 1992.
An interview with music and video archivist David Lemieux, previously unreleased.

References

Grateful Dead compilation albums
Rock video albums
2012 video albums
2012 compilation albums
Grateful Dead live albums
Live video albums
Shout! Factory video albums
Shout! Factory live albums
Shout! Factory compilation albums
Grateful Dead video albums